The Superior Red Sox were a Minnesota–Wisconsin League (1910–1911), Central International League (1912) and Northern League (1913–1916) minor league baseball team based in Superior, Wisconsin. The Red Sox won the Minnesota–Wisconsin League pennant in 1911, under manager John "Kid" Taylor. Future Hall of Fame shortstop Dave Bancroft played for the team from 1910 to 1911.

References

Defunct minor league baseball teams
Baseball teams established in 1903
1903 establishments in Wisconsin
Baseball teams disestablished in 1916
Northern League (1902-71) baseball teams
Minnesota-Wisconsin League teams
Central International League teams
Professional baseball teams in Wisconsin
1916 disestablishments in Wisconsin
Superior, Wisconsin
Defunct baseball teams in Wisconsin